Adam Sultanovich Delimkhanov (born 25 September 1969) is a Russian politician who has been member of the Russian State Duma since 2007. He is a member of the United Russia. He heads the Chechen branch of Rosgvardia. 

Delimkhanov is an ally of Chechen leader Ramzan Kadyrov.

Biography 
A close associate and cousin of Chechen leader Ramzan Kadyrov, Delimkhanov headed the police division that protected Chechen oil facilities from 2003 to 2006. He was appointed deputy prime minister overseeing security forces in 2006. The next year he was elected to the Russian State Duma on a Vladimir Putin-led United Russia party ticket.

A Chechen exile, Umar Israilov, murdered in Vienna in January 2009, had accused Delimkhanov of beating him in Kadyrov's presence. Delimkhanov declined requests for comment on the allegation. In April 2009, the Dubai police blamed Delimkhanov for having ordered the assassination of the former Chechen warlord and Russian military commander Sulim Yamadayev. Delimkhanov denied the accusation, saying it was a provocation directed to destabilize Chechnya and that he is preparing to sue Dubai police for libel. 

As of April 2009, Delimkhanov—along with six other Russian citizens—is wanted by Dubai, one of the emirates of the UAE, in connection with the murder of Sulim Yamadayev, via Interpol.

In 2020, BBC News reported on Delimkhanov in relation to the murder of Imran Aliev.

On 1 February, 2022, Delimkhanov shared a video on Instagram threatening human rights lawyer Abubakar Yangulbaev and his family with death. "We will pursue you until we cut off your heads and kill you," he said in the video that was denounced by Amnesty International. In January, Yangulbaev's mother was abducted by Kadyrov's forces.

According to Kadyrov, Delimkhanov participated in the Siege of Mariupol during the 2022 Russian invasion of Ukraine as commander of the Chechen forces in the engagement. On the 26th of April 2022, it was announced by Kadyrov that Delimkhanov has received the Hero of the Russian Federation honorary award by decree of the President, Vladimir Putin.

Sanctions 
In July 2014, the U.S. Treasury Department imposed sanctions on Delimkhanov. These sanctions include freezing of assets in the United States and a ban on commercial transactions.

In July 2022 the EU imposed sanctions on Adam Delimkhanov in relation to the 2022 Russian invasion of Ukraine.

Wealth 
In the ranking of 500 Russian billionaires compiled by Finans. magazine in early 2011, Adam Delimkhanov took 314th place. His capital was estimated at 300 million dollars or 9.1 billion rubles. According to official figures for 2011, Delimkhanov received an income of 1.9 million rubles, and his wife 187 thousand rubles.

References

External links 
Interpol: Wanted: Adam Delimkhanov

1969 births
Chechen politicians
Deputy prime ministers of Chechnya
Fugitives wanted on murder charges
Living people
Russian people of Chechen descent
Chechen people
United Russia politicians
21st-century Russian politicians
Fifth convocation members of the State Duma (Russian Federation)
Sixth convocation members of the State Duma (Russian Federation)
Seventh convocation members of the State Duma (Russian Federation)
Eighth convocation members of the State Duma (Russian Federation)
Russian individuals subject to the U.S. Department of the Treasury sanctions
Heroes of the Russian Federation